Trebnji Vrh is a small settlement in the Municipality of Semič in Slovenia. It lies in the hills south of Semič in the historical region of Lower Carniola. The municipality is now included in the Southeast Slovenia Statistical Region.

References

External links
Trebnji Vrh at Geopedia

Populated places in the Municipality of Semič